This is a bibliography and filmography of the People's Mujahedin of Iran (MEK) covering the key works published in various mediums, excluding news content and direct publications of the MEK. They are sorted in ascending order.

Written works

Encyclopedia entries

Books 
English

 
 
 
 
 
 
 
 
 

Non-English

Chapters

Articles

Reports

Documentary films 

 
 The Strange World of the People's Mujahedin (2012): BBC World Service documentary directed by Owen Bennett-Jones and produced by Wisebuddah company. It won New York Festivals award for Best Investigative Report in 2013.

Series, films and documentaries by the Islamic Republic of Iran on the MEK 

 
 
 Handwritings: The 1987 action, Drama, Thriller film was directed by Mehrzad Minui, based on scenario of Behrouz Afkhami.
 The Wolves: four-part eight-houred documentary series initially released in 2007 and reissued in 2013 as a 90-minutes documentary, aired by the Islamic Republic of Iran Broadcasting. It includes footage from Ba'athist Iraq archives of confidential top-level meetings.
  Somayeh Mohammadi said that the videos and photos used in the documentary were "given to the regime's intelligence to make a documentary against PMOI."
 The Insider: 2008 feature film directed by Ahmad Kaveri and starring Amir Jafari as an MEK defector who returns to Iran in 2004.
 Cyanide: 2016 feature film directed by Behrouz Shoaibi which portrays the organization during the 1970s. The cast includes Babak Hamidian, Behnoosh Tabatabaei, Hanieh Tavassoli, Atila Pesyani, Mehdi Hashemi and Hamed Komeili.
 Mina's Choice: 2016 drama about a happy marriage of couple Mina and Mehran which tears apart. According to the director Kamal Tabrizi and producer Manouchehr Mohammadi, the film intends to "give warnings to families" about the MEK.
 The Midday Event: 2017 political drama directed by Mohammad-Hossein Mahdavian, it features the MEK during the 1980s and was named the best film in the 35th Fajr International Film Festival.
 The Gift of Darkness: 2011 drama series directed by Jalil Saman features the MEK during the 1980s.
 Parvaneh: 2013 drama series directed by Jalil Saman about the MEK during the 1970s.
 Nafas: 2017 drama series directed by Jalil Saman features 1970s.
 Trace of blood, second season of "The Midday Event", political drama directed by Mohammad-Hossein Mahdavian, it features the MEK during Operation Mersad and was awarded in the 37th Fajr International Film Festival.

References 

Works
People's Mujahedin of Iran
People's Mujahedin of Iran
People's Mujahedin of Iran